Ivan Ratkić (born 22 February 1986) is a former Croatian alpine skier.

Ratkić was born in Zagreb, at the time in SR Croatia, SFR Yugoslavia.
He is a member of SK Medveščak. Ratkić has competed at the 2006 and 2010 Winter Olympics. He competed at the FIS Alpine World Ski Championships on three occasions. His best result is 13th place in super combined at the 2009 World Championships in Val d'Isere, France.

His best World Cup result is 30th position at the super combined race in Beaver Creek in 2009. He has entered 9 World Cup races in his career.

References 

FIS profile
Croatian Ski Federation profile
Predstavljamo: Ivan Ratkić

1986 births
Living people
Croatian male alpine skiers
Alpine skiers at the 2006 Winter Olympics
Alpine skiers at the 2010 Winter Olympics
Olympic alpine skiers of Croatia
Sportspeople from Zagreb